Trent's Last Case is a 1952 British detective film directed by Herbert Wilcox and starring Michael Wilding, Margaret Lockwood, Orson Welles and John McCallum. It was based on the 1913 novel Trent's Last Case by E. C. Bentley, and had been filmed previously in the UK with Clive Brook in 1920, and in a 1929 US version.

It was also the film debut of actor Kenneth Williams, best known for his roles in the Carry On comedy film series.

Plot
A major international financier is found dead at his Hampshire home. The Record newspaper assigns its leading investigative reporter, Phillip Trent, to the case. In spite of the police cordon, he manages to gain entry to the house by posing as a relative. While there he manages to pick up some of the background to the case from Inspector Murch, the Irish detective leading the investigation. Despite Murch's suggestion that the death is suicide, Trent quickly becomes convinced that it was in fact murder.

At the inquest, the coroner swiftly concludes that the deceased, Sigsbee Manderson, had killed himself. Trent, however, is given permission by his editor to continue to pursue the story. His attention is drawn to Manderson's widow, Margaret.

Cast
 Michael Wilding as Phillip Trent
 Margaret Lockwood as Margaret Manderson
 Orson Welles as Sigsbee Manderson
 John McCallum as John Marlowe
 Miles Malleson as Burton Cupples
 Hugh McDermott as Calvin C. Bunner
 Jack McNaughton as Mr Martin, the butler
 Sam Kydd as Inspector Murch
 Henry Edwards as Coroner
 Geoffrey Bayldon as Reporter in court
 Robert Cawdron as PC
 John Chandos as Tim O'Rielly
 Ben Williams as Jimmy, the reporter
 Kenneth Williams as Horace Evans, the junior gardener

Production
Margaret Lockwood had just signed a contract with Herbert Wilcox who was better known for making films with his wife, Anna Neagle. Neagle and Lockwood were among the most popular British stars in the country in the 1940s. Lockwood's career had been in a slump and this film was seen as a comeback. It was her first film in two years. The arrangement with Wilcox would kill off Lockwood's career as a star.

Herbert Wilcox wrote in his memoirs that he paid Orson Welles £12,000 for his role but because Welles was in so much debt the actor wound up with only £150. Wilcox and Welles worked together again on Trouble in the Glen (1954). Lockwood wrote in her memoirs that she adored working with Wilcox. She said "Orson is a genius and like most geniuses in my experience, sometimes a trifle off. His oddity, or so it seemed to me while making this picture, was that he wanted to play his love scenes with me entirely by himself; without me... I must say they were very successful."
The film's sets were designed by the art director William C. Andrews.

In one scene, Eileen Joyce is shown playing part of Mozart's C minor Concerto, K. 491 at the Royal Opera House with an orchestra under Anthony Collins.

Critical reception
Leonard Maltin rated the film 2.5 out of 4 stars and noted "superior cast in lukewarm tale of the investigation of businessman's death" while Jay Carr on the TCM website, wrote, "In Trent's Last Case, Welles shares the spotlight with his spectacular putty nose. It's a mighty ice-breaker of a nose, straight-edged as a steel blade, pulverizing all in its path, including whatever pretension to credibility this creaky British murder mystery might have retained."

References

External links
Trent's Last Case (1952) at IMDb
Trent's Last Case at TCMDB
Review of film at Variety

1952 films
British detective films
Republic Pictures films
Films directed by Herbert Wilcox
Films based on British novels
Films based on mystery novels
British mystery films
Remakes of British films
Films set in Hampshire
Films based on works by Edmund Clerihew Bentley
British black-and-white films
1950s English-language films
1950s British films